The 65th annual Venice International Film Festival, held in Venice, Italy, was opened on 27 August 2008 by Burn After Reading, and closed on 6 September 2008. International competition jury, led by Wim Wenders, awarded Leone d'Oro to The Wrestler, directed by Darren Aronofsky.

Most of the films at the festival were world premieres. Featured in the 65th film festival was a restored version of Federico Fellini's 1952 comedy The White Sheik  with forty minutes of newly discovered footage. Films screened out of competition included 35 Rums by French director Claire Denis, Iranian film-maker Abbas Kiarostami's film, Shirin and an autobiographical documentary by Belgium-born director Agnès Varda. The record for the longest film at the festival went to Philippine director Lav Diaz's Melancholia, with a running time of approximately seven and a half hours, and which is included in the Orizzonti (Horizons) section.

77-year-old Italian film director Ermanno Olmi received a Golden Lion for Lifetime Achievement. The festival was dedicated to the late Egyptian director Youssef Chahine, who was notable for his contributions to post-war Arab cinema. The festival's shorts competition began 1 September 2008 with Natalie Portman's directorial debut, Eve. Kseniya Rappoport will also hosted the opening and closing ceremonies.

Juries
The international juries of the 65th Venice International Film Festival were composed as follows:

Main Competition (Venezia 65)
Wim Wenders, German filmmaker, playwright, author and photographer (Jury President)
Yuri Arabov, Russian screenwriter, writer, poet and educator
Valeria Golino, Italian actress and director
Douglas Gordon, Scottish artist
John Landis, American director, screenwriter, actor and producer
Lucrecia Martel, Argentine director, screenwriter, and producer
Johnnie To, Hong Kong director and producer

Horizons (Orizzonti)
Chantal Akerman, Belgian director, artist and professor of film (President)
Nicole Brenez, French historian, theoretician and professor of cinema
Barbara Cupisti, Italian documentary director and actress
José Luis Guerín, Spanish filmmaker and educator
Veiko Õunpuu, Estonian film director and screenwriter

Opera Prima ("Luigi de Laurentiis" Award for a Debut Film)
Abdellatif Kechiche, Tunisian-French actor, director and screenwriter (President)
Alice Braga, Brazilian actress
Gregory Jacobs, American director, producer and screenwriter
Donald Ranvaud, British producer and film journalist
Heidrun Schleef, Italian screenwriter and producer

Official selection

In competition
The competitive section of the official selection is an international competition of feature films in 35mm and digital HD format running for the Golden Lion.

Highlighted title indicates the Golden Lion winner.

Out of competition
New works by directors who have been honored in past festivals, as well as movies shown in the midnight time band.

Short film competition
The following films were selected for the Short film competition (Corto Cortissimo) section:

Highlighted title indicates Lion for Best Short Film winner.

Horizons
The following films were selected for the Horizons (Orizzonti) section:

Highlighted titles indicate the Horizons Awards for Best Film and Best Documentary respectively.

These Phantoms: Italian Cinema Rediscovered (1946-1975)
Retrospective screenings and restorations. Special monographic sessions dedicated to the "secret story of Italian cinema". This is the fifth part of the retrospective, initiated at the 61st edition of the festival.

Autonomous sections

Venice International Film Critics' Week
The following films were selected for the 23rd International Film Critics' Week:

{| class="sortable wikitable" style="width:95%; margin-bottom:0px"
! colspan=4| In competition
|-
! English title
! Original title
! Director(s)
! Production country
|-
| The Apprentice || L'apprenti || Samuel Collardey || France
|-
| Cucumber || Huanggua / Qing gua || Zhou Yaowu || China
|-
| colspan=2| Kabuli Kid || Barmak Akram || France, Afghanistan
|-style="background:#E7CD00;"
| Mid-August Lunch || Pranzo di ferragosto || Gianni Di Gregorio || Italy
|-
| Nightguards || Čuvari noći || Namik Kabil || Bosnia
|-
| colspan=2| Sell Out! || Yeo Joonhan || Malaysia
|-
| Two Lines ||Iki Çizgi'  || Selim Evci || Turkey
|}

Highlighted title indicates the Lion Of The Future winner.

Venice Days
The following films were selected for the 5th edition of Venice Days (Giornate Degli Autori) autonomous section:

Awards
Official selection
The following Official Awards were conferred at the 65th edition:

In Competition (Venezia 65)
 Golden Lion: The Wrestler by Darren Aronofsky
 Silver Lion for Best Director: Aleksei German for Bumazhnyy soldat (Paper Soldier)
 Special Jury Prize: Teza by Haile Gerima
 Volpi Cup for Best Actor: Silvio Orlando for Giovanna's Father Volpi Cup for Best Actress: Dominique Blanc for The Other One Marcello Mastroianni Award (for the best emerging actor or actress): Jennifer Lawrence for Burning Plain Golden Osella for Best Cinematography: Alisher Khamidhodjaev and Maxim Drozdov for Bumazhnyy soldat Golden Osella for Best Screenplay: Haile Gerima for Teza Special Lion for Overall Work: Werner Schroeter

Horizons awards (Premi Orizzonti)
 Best Film: Melancholia by Lav Diaz (Philippines)
 Best Documentary: Below Sea Level by Gianfranco Rosi
 Special Mention: Un Lac by Philippe Grandrieux & Wo men (We) by Huang Wenhai

Short Film awards (Corto Cortissimo Lion)
 Lion for Best Short Film: Tierra y Pan by Carlos Armella
 Special Mention: Vacsora by Karchi Perlmann
 U.I.P. Award for Best European Short: De onbaatzuchtigen by Koen Dejaegher

Autonomous sections
The following official and collateral awards were conferred to films of the autonomous sections:

Venice International Film Critics' Week
 Best Film: The Apprentice (L'apprenti) by Samuel Collardey
 Lion of the Future 
 Luigi De Laurentiis Award For a Debut Film: Mid-August Lunch (Pranzo di ferragosto) by Gianni Di Gregorio
 Isvema Award for a debut or second feature film: Mid-August Lunch by Gianni Di Gregorio
 Doc/it Award – Special mention: The Apprentice by Samuel Collardey
 "Altre Visioni" Award: Sell Out! by Yeo Joon Han
 EIUC Human Rights Film Award: Kabuli Kid by Akram Barmak

Venice Days (Giornate Degli Autori)
 Label Europa Cinemas Award: Machan by Uberto Pasolini
 Christopher D. Smithers Foundation Special Awards: Stella by Sylvie Verheyde
 FEDIC Award: Machan by Uberto Pasolini
 Lina Mangiacapre Award: Stella by Sylvie Verheyde

Other collateral awards
The following collateral awards were conferred to films of the official selection:

 FIPRESCI Award
 Best Film (Main competition): Gabbla (Inland) by Tariq Teguia
 Best Film (Out of competition): Goodbye Solo by Ramin Bahrani
 SIGNIS Award: The Hurt Locker by Kathryn Bigelow
 Special mention: Vegas: Based on a True Story by Amir Naderi & Teza by Haile Gerima
 Francesco Pasinetti Award (SNGCI):
 Best Film: Mid-August Lunch by Gianni Di Gregorio
 Special Mention: Pa-ra-da by Marco Pontecorvo (Out of competition)
 Best Actor: Silvio Orlando for Giovanna's Father Best Actress: Isabella Ferrari for Un giorno perfetto Doc/it Award – Sicilia Film Commission: Below Sea Level by Gianfranco Rosi
 Leoncino d'oro Agiscuola Award: Giovanna's Father by Pupi Avati
 Queer Lion: One Day in a Life (Un altro pianeta) by Stefano Tummolini
 UNICEF Award: Teza by Haile Gerima
 Art Cinema Award: Dikoe Pole (Wild Field) by Mikheil Kalatozishvili (Out of competition)
 La Navicella – Venezia Cinema Award: The Hurt Locker by Kathryn Bigelow
 C.I.C.T. UNESCO Enrico Fulchignoni Award: BirdWatchers (La terra degli uomini rossi) by Marco Bechis
 Biografilm Lancia Award:
 Best Fiction Film: Rachel Getting Married by Jonathan Demme
 Best Documentary: Below Sea Level by Gianfranco Rosi (Horizons)
 Nazareno Taddei Award: Giovanna's Father by Pupi Avati
 Don Gnocchi Award: Pa-ra-da by Marco Pontecorvo (Out of competition)
 Special mention: Ezio Greggio for Giovanna's Father Future Film Festival Digital Award: The Sky Crawlers by Mamoru Oshii
 Special mention: Gake no ue no Ponyo (Ponyo on the Cliff by the Sea) by Hayao Miyazaki
 Brian Award: Khastegi by Bahman Motamedian (Horizons)
 Lanterna Magica Award (Cgs): Pa-ra-da by Marco Pontecorvo (Out of competition)
 CinemAvvenire, Best Film in Competition: Vegas: Based on a True Story by Amir Naderi
 "The circle is not round. Cinema for peace and the richness of diversity" Award: Teza by Haile Gerima
 Bastone Bianco Award (Filmcritica): Achilles and the Tortoise (Akires to kame) by Takeshi Kitano
 Human Rights Film Network Award: The Hurt Locker by Kahryn Bigelow
 Arca Cinemagiovani Award:
 Best Film: The Hurt Locker by Kathryn Bigelow
 Best Italian Film: Mid-August Lunch by Gianni Di Gregorio
 Air For Film Fest Award: Pa-ra-da by Marco Pontecorvo
 "Poveri ma belli" Award: Puccini e la fanciulla by Paolo Benvenuti (Out of competition)
 Mimmo Rotella Foundation Award for a film which shows a firm connection with the arts: Gake no ue no Ponyo (Ponyo on the Cliff by the Sea) by Hayao Miyazaki
 Open Award 2008: The Butcher's Shop'' by Philip Haas

References

External links

Venice Film Festival 2008 Awards on IMDb

Ven
65th
2008 film festivals
2008 festivals in Europe
Film
August 2008 events in Europe
September 2008 events in Europe